Womersley is a surname. Notable people with the surname include:
 Cecilia Womersley (born 1943), an alpine skier from New Zealand
 Chris Womersley (born 1968), an Australian author of crime fiction, short stories and poetry
 Chris Womersley (alpine skier) (born 1949), an alpine skier from New Zealand
 Ernest Womersley (born 1932), a former professional football player
 Gary Womersley (living), a Scottish National Party politician
 Herbert Womersley (1889-1962), an entomologist and acarologist
 Hugh Bryan Spencer Womersley (born 1922), a botanist
 John Womersley (1896-?), a World War I flying ace
 John Lewis Womersley (1910-1990), Sheffield City Architect
 John R. Womersley (1907-1958), a British mathematician
 Patteson Womersley Nickalls (1877-1946), a British polo player
 Peter Womersley (1923–1993), a British architect
 Sir Walter Womersley, 1st Baronet (1878–1961), a British Conservative Party politician

See also
 Womersley baronets, a title in the Baronetage of the United Kingdom